Kirki railway station is a railway station in the small town of Kristoni, that serves the nearby town of Kilkis, both in Kilkis in Central Macedonia, Greece. The station is unmanned but has waiting rooms available and a taxi rank

History
The station opened in 1900 as part of the Salonica Monastir railway, built by the Enotikos Thessalonica-Istanbul Company. The station, along with the line west, was annexed by Greece on 18 October 1912 during the First Balkan War. On 17 October 1925, The Greek government purchased the Greek sections of the former Salonica Monastir railway, and the railway became part of the Hellenic State Railways, with the remaining section north of Florina seeded to Yugoslavia. On 1 January 1971, the station and most of the Greek rail infrastructure were transferred to the Hellenic Railways Organisation S.A., a state-owned corporation. Freight traffic declined sharply when the state-imposed monopoly of OSE for the transport of agricultural products and fertilisers ended in the early 1990s. Many small stations of the network with little passenger traffic were closed down.

In 2001 the infrastructure element of OSE was created, known as GAIAOSE; it would henceforth be responsible for the maintenance of stations, bridges and other elements of the network, as well as the leasing and the sale of railway assists. In 2003, OSE launched "Proastiakos SA", as a subsidiary to serve the operation of the suburban network in the urban complex of Athens during the 2004 Olympic Games. In 2005, TrainOSE was created as a brand within OSE to concentrate on rail services and passenger interface.

On 9 September 2007, the station reopened. In 2008, all Proastiakos services were transferred from OSE to TrainOSE. In 2009, with the Greek debt crisis unfolding OSE's Management was forced to reduce services across the network. Timetables were cut back, and routes closed as the government-run entity attempted to reduce overheads. Services from Thessaloniki and Alexandroupolis were reduced from six to just two trains a day, reducing the reliability of services and passenger numbers. In 2017 OSE's passenger transport sector was privatised as TrainOSE, currently, a wholly-owned subsidiary of Ferrovie dello Stato Italiane infrastructure, including stations, remained under the control of OSE. Since 2020, the station has been served by the Proastiakos Thessaloniki services to New Railway Station. In July 2022, the station began being served by Hellenic Train, the rebranded TranOSE

Services
It is served by long-distance and Intercity services between Thessaloniki and Alexandroupolis, and Regional services to Ormenio

Between July 2005 and February 2011, the Friendship Express, (an international InterCity train jointly operated by the Turkish State Railways (TCDD) and TrainOSE linking Istanbul's Sirkeci Terminal, Turkey and Thessaloniki, Greece) made scheduled stops at Kilkis.

References

External links
 Kilkis Station - National Railway Network Greek Travel Pages

Railway stations in Central Macedonia
Railway stations opened in 1900